Samuel J Leffler is a computer scientist, known for his extensive work on BSD, from the 1980s to FreeBSD in the present day.  Among other projects, he created FlexFAX, LibTIFF, and the FreeBSD Wireless Device Drivers.

The Design and Implementation series of books, which he co-authored,   

While working for the Computer Systems Research Group (CSRG, UC Berkeley) at University of California, Berkeley, Leffler helped with 4.1 and 4.2 BSD release. He has contributed to almost every aspect of BSD systems, including the networking subsystem. After leaving Computer Systems Research Group, Mr. Leffler also worked at Lucasfilm, Pixar Animation Studios, Silicon Graphics, Alias Research, Softimage 3D, Cinetron Computer Systems and VMware. Later he became an independent consultant on system design.

Computer Animation Rendering
André and Wally B. (1984) texturing/matteing
Luxo Jr. (1986) rendering
Tin Toy (1988) renderman team
Toy Story (1995) modeling & animation system development/Renderman software development

References

Bibliography
 S. Leffler, M. McKusick, M. Karels, J. Quarterman: The Design and Implementation of the 4.3BSD UNIX Operating System, Addison-Wesley, January 1989, . German translation published June 1990, . Japanese translation published June 1991,  (out of print).
 S. Leffler, M. McKusick: The Design and Implementation of the 4.3BSD UNIX Operating System Answer Book, Addison-Wesley, April 1991, . Japanese translation published January 1992,

External links 
 Interview: Sam Leffler of the FreeBSD Foundation

BSD people
American computer scientists
Free software programmers
FreeBSD people
Living people
Lucasfilm people
Year of birth missing (living people)